Mindaugas Šliūpas (1919–1979) was a Lithuanian basketball player. He won gold medal with the Lithuania national basketball team during EuroBasket 1939. He played one game against Finland and scored no points.

He was a son of physician Rokas Šliūpas and nephew of activist Jonas Šliūpas. After graduating from the Kaunas War School, he studied law at the Vytautas Magnus University. On 15–22 April 1945, while World War II was still ongoing, the Soviet Union organized the 6th tournament of eight cities in Kaunas. Šliūpas was the only team member who played in the EuroBasket 1939. The Lithuanian team won all games except it tied with the Moscow team 25:25. The Moscow team evened out the score after a being awarded questionable free throw and was declared the overall winner of the tournament based on the overall points scored during the tournament. After the tournament, several Lithuanian basketball players, including Šliūpas, Vincas Sercevičius, Stasys Šačkus, Vilius Variakojis, were arrested and deported to Gulag camps. Šliūpas was arrested on 16 June 1945 and was  imprisoned in a Dalstroy camp in the Magadan Oblast. He was released in 1956 and returned to Lithuania. Upon his return, he worked in land improvement and drainage.

References

Lithuanian men's basketball players
FIBA EuroBasket-winning players
Gulag detainees
1919 births
1979 deaths